Beli Potok pri Frankolovem is a small settlement in the Municipality of Vojnik in eastern Slovenia. It lies next to White Creek, from which it gets its name, just off the main road north of Vojnik to Slovenske Konjice. The area is part of the traditional region of Styria. It is now included with the rest of the municipality in the Savinja Statistical Region.

Name
The name of the settlement was changed from Beli Potok to Beli Potok pri Frankolovem in 1953.

References

External links
Beli Potok pri Frankolovem at Geopedia

Populated places in the Municipality of Vojnik